Camp Bondsteel is the operation headquarters of the Kosovo Force (KFOR) in Kosovo. It is located near Ferizaj in eastern Kosovo. It is the Regional Command-East headed by the United States Army (U.S. Army) and it is supported by troops from Greece, Italy, Finland, Hungary, Poland, Slovenia, Switzerland and Turkey. The base is named after U.S. Army Staff Sergeant James L. Bondsteel, who is a Medal of Honor recipient.

The camp occupies  of land. During the construction of the base, two hills were flattened and the valley between them was filled. In August 1999, 52 helipads were constructed on the facility's west perimeter to handle helicopter aviation.

Facilities

Camp Bondsteel was constructed by the 94th Engineer Construction Battalion, augmented by A Company, 864th Engineer Battalion and the 568 Combat Support Engineer Company, together with the Kellogg, Brown and Root Corporation (KBR). KBR was also the prime contractor for the operation of the camp. The planning, design, and construction management of the project was completed by the Construction Management Section of the 130th Engineer Brigade and a team from the Baltimore District of the U.S. Army Corps of Engineers. 

Camp Bondsteel has several facilities on base, all built with US military aid, that are used by both soldiers and civilian employees alike. The base can house up to 7,000 soldiers, making it the largest American base in the Balkans. The post exchange (PX) is the largest military exchange in Southeastern Europe and contains various necessities and luxuries. All of this is housed in the PX's two-story building.

The base also has a hospital, two gyms, and two recreation buildings with phones, computers, pool tables, and video games. Camp Bondsteel also has a chapel, a large dining facility, a fire station, a military police station, two cappuccino bars, a Burger King, Taco Bell, and an Anthony's Pizza. There is also a barber shop, a laundry facility employing local nationals, a dry cleaner, a tailor, various local vendors who sell Kosovo souvenirs and products, and sports fields.

Controversies

Camp Bondsteel is not open to inspections by the Committee for the Prevention of Torture (CPT), which has the right to visit all "places of detention" of the member states of the Council of Europe. Negotiations with KFOR were underway but were suspended because of Kosovo's unilateral declaration of independence, which was not recognised by the Council of Europe. The United States Army had been criticised for using the base as a detention facility for suspected terrorists.
In November 2005, Álvaro Gil-Robles, the human rights envoy of the Council of Europe, described the camp as a "smaller version of Guantanamo" following a visit. The US Army has denied this accusation and stated that there were no secret detention facilities in the Camp.

Gallery

See also
List of United States military bases
International recognition of Kosovo

References

Notes

External links

 GlobalSecurity.org - Camp Bondsteel profile
 Guardian Online: Multi-National Task Force East (MNTF-E)
 Report on Council of Europe's criticism
 satellite photo from google maps

1999 establishments in Kosovo
Military camps in Kosovo
Ferizaj
Kosovo War
Military installations established in 1999
Military installations of the United States in Kosovo
Bondsteel, Camp